Raphael, Raphaël, or Refael is a common surname.

It may refer to:


Raphael

A
 Adam Raphael (born 1938), English journalist
 Alexander Raphael (before 18351850), British-Armenian Member of Parliament
 Allan Raphael (born 1931), Canadian field hockey player who competed in the 1964 Summer Olympics
 Anthony Raphael (born 1976), U.S. construction guru

B
 Bertram Raphael (born 1936), American computer scientist

C
 Charlie Raphael (active from 1978), U.S. soccer player
 Chadwick Raphael (active from 1979), U.S. CFO

D
 Daniel Rafael (born 1961), Canadian male curler an curling coach
 Dennis Raphael (active from 1972), American academic in the field of health policy and management

F
 Frederick Raphael (born 1931), American born writer resident in England

G
 Gerrianne Raphael (born 1935), American actress and voice actor
 Gordon Raphael (born before 1989), American record producer and musician
 Günter Raphael (190360), German composer

H
 Herbert Raphael (18591924), British barrister and Liberal Party politician
 Hillary Raphael (born 1976), American novelist

J
 Jean-Claude Raphael (born 1973), Mauritian judoka
 John Raphael (disambiguation), multiple people
 Joseph Raphael (18691950), American Impressionist painter
 June Diane Raphael (born 1980), American actress, comedian, and screenwriter

K
 KOSEKI Aquila Raphael (active from 1990), Japanese producer, story architect and Jungian scholar

L
 Lawrence Raphael (active from 1970), American academic in the field of speech production and perception
 Lennox Raphael (born 1939), Trinidadian journalist, poet, and playwright
 Lenore Raphael (birth name Lenore Hyams, born 1942), American jazz pianist and educator

M
 Max Raphael (1889–1952), German-American art historian
 Max Raphael (born 1956), stage name of Lloyd Sherr, American voice actor
 Mickey Raphael (born 1951), American harmonica player

N
 Nick Raphael (born 1971), British music industry executive
 Suicide of Nicola Ann Raphael (19852001), Scottish schoolgirl

R
 Ralph Raphael (192198), British organic chemist
 Ray Raphael (born 1943), American historian and author

S
 Sally Jessy Raphael (birth name Sally Lowenthal, born 1935), American talk show host
 Sarah Raphael (19602001), English artist

T
 Tsuriel Raphael (born 1952), Israeli diplomat

W
 William Raphael (18331914), Canadian artist
 Winifred Raphael (18981978), British occupational psychologist

Raphaël
 Antonietta Raphaël (18951975), Italian sculptor and painter

See also
Raphael (given name)
Raphael (disambiguation)
Rafael (disambiguation)

Jewish surnames